Raiden may refer to:

Raijin, also called Raiden or Raiden-sama, the god of thunder and lightning in Japanese mythology

Arcade and video games

Raiden (Mortal Kombat) (sometimes spelled Rayden), a character in the Mortal Kombat video game series
Raiden (series), a series of scrolling shooter arcade games
Raiden (video game), the first game in the series
Raiden II
Raiden DX
Raiden III
Raiden IV
Raiden V
The Raiden Fighters series, a later arcade shooter series that uses the Raiden name.
Raiden Fighters
Raiden Fighters 2, subtitled Operation Hell Dive
Raiden Fighters Jet
Raiden (Metal Gear), a character in Metal Gear series
Raiden (Fatal Fury), a character in the Fatal Fury series
RAIDEN series, a series of Virturoids from the Sega game Virtual On
Raiden Mei, a character in Honkai Impact 3rd
Raiden Shogun, a character in Genshin Impact

Other 

 Raiden (film), a 1928 film directed by Shōzō Makino
Raiden Tameemon (Seki Tarōkichi; 1767–1825), a Japanese sumo wrestler
Raiden (DJ), a South Korean DJ and record producer
Mitsubishi J2M "Raiden", a Japanese World War II fighter aircraft
AMD Raiden, codename for a project by Advanced Micro Devices concerning client computing
Gwen Raiden, a minor character on the TV series Angel
Trainbots, a fictional team of Autobots that can form Raiden in Transformers: The Headmasters

See also
Thunderbolt (disambiguation)
Lightning bolt (disambiguation)
Thunderclap (disambiguation)
Ikazuchi (disambiguation)
Inazuma (disambiguation)